Kodumba is a village and gram panchayat in Palakkad district in the state of Kerala, India.

Demographics 
 India census, Kodumba had a population of 19,138 with 9,382 males and 9,756 females.

Temples
Kodumbu Subramanya Swamy Temple
built by Tamil Sengunthar Kaikola Mudaliyar community.

References 

Villages in Palakkad district
Gram panchayats in Palakkad district